Peter Adolf Persson (September 25, 1862 – January 15, 1914) was a Swedish painter known for his  Skåne landscapes.

Biography
Persson was born in the parish of  Kvistofa  in Skåne, Sweden. 
He studied at the Royal Swedish Academy of Fine Arts in Stockholm from 1882–86 where he trained under Per Daniel Holm (1835-1903). 
During his stay in France from 1889-1890, he stayed west of Paris at Suresnes.

He exhibited at Valands in Gothenburg in 1911 and  Helsingborg in 1913. He participated at the Paris Salon in 1890,  Nordic Exhibition of 1888 at Copenhagen, Norrköping Exhibition of Art and Industry in 1906,  Lund Exhibition in 1907 and  Baltic Exhibition at Malmö in 1914.

Noted for his local Skane landscapes, his work is represented in the Nationalmuseum, Malmo Museum, Helsingborg,  Landskrona Museum and the Lund University Art Museum.

He died during 1914 at Tyringe in Skåne .

Gallery

References

Further reading 
Lexikonett amanda och Kultur1
Svenskt konstnärslexikon del IV sid 399-400, Allhems Förlag, Malmö. LIBRIS-ID:8390296
Svenska konstnärer, Biografisk handbok, Väbo förlag, 1987, sid 414,

External links 

1862 births
1914 deaths
Swedish landscape painters
People from Scania